Suzhou No.10 Middle School is a four-star middle school in Jiangsu province. It is located in the south-east of Suzhou. It has operated for more than a century.

History 

Suzhou No.10 Middle School was established by Wangxie Changda in 1906 as Zhenhua Girls' High School. Zhang Binglin and Cai Yuanpei once served as school managers. In 1917, Wang Jiyu took charge. Many celebrities taught here, including Zhang Taiyan, Hu Shizhi and Bei Shizhang.

Scenery 

Suzhou No.10 Middle School is regarded as ‘the most Chinese school’. The West Garden holds the remains of the Weaving Department of the Qing dynasty. Many antiques and monuments are present on campus, such as the Ruiyun Peak, Zhenhua Hall, Weiji Tablet, Jisi Pavilion and the Ninghuai Pavilion.

Alumni 

Notable alumni include Fei Xiaotong, Professor He Zehui, Yang Jiang, He Yizhen, Hu Shuqin, Yan Weimin, Wang Shuzhen and Zhu Linan.

References 

High schools in Suzhou
Educational institutions established in 1906
Junior secondary schools in China
1906 establishments in China